Jón Magnússon  may refer to:

 Jón Magnússon, Earl of Orkney in 1284–c. 1300
 Jón Magnússon (author), 17th century Icelandic author
 Jón Magnússon (politician) (1859-1926), prime minister of Iceland
 Jón Arnar Magnússon, Icelandic decathlete
 Jon Magnusson (producer), producer of I'm Sorry I Haven't A Clue
 Jón Magnússon (handballer)
 Jón Magnússon (painter), born 1966